Peter Woeste (also known as Peter F. Woeste) is a German/Canadian TV director, cinematographer and camera operator. Woeste is best known for his work on Stargate SG-1 as a director and director of photography. Along with Jim Menard, Woeste was one of Stargate SG-1's main cinematographers during its ten-year series run, starting with the pilot episode "Children of the Gods". He also worked on the spin-off Stargate Atlantis and was the cinematographer of the Stargate: Continuum and Stargate: The Ark of Truth direct-to-DVD movies.

He was nominated for an ASC Award in 1997 for In Cold Blood in the category "Outstanding Achievement in Cinematography in Mini-Series", and won a 1997 Blizzard Award in the category "Best Cinematography - Dramatic" for Paris or Somewhere. He was nominated for a Gemini Award in the category "Best Photography in a Dramatic Program or Series" three times: in 1994 for Neon Rider, in 1997 for The Legend of the Ruby Silver, and in 2004  for the Stargate SG-1 episode "Nightwalkers". He was nominated for a Leo award in 2008 in the category "Best Cinematography in a feature length production" for Stargate Continuum.

Personal life
Peter formerly taught cinematography at the Nat and Flora Bosa Centre for Film and Animation at Capilano University in North Vancouver, British Columbia.

Selected filmography

Director
Stargate SG-1 (11 episodes, 2000–2006)
Stargate Atlantis (1 episode, 2008)

Cinematographer
Stargate: Continuum (2008)
Stargate: The Ark of Truth (2008)
Stargate SG-1 (94 episodes, 1997–2007)
Stargate Atlantis (9 episodes, 1997–2003)
Profit (5 episodes, 1996–1997)
Sliders (8 episodes, 1995)
Neon Rider (19 episodes, 1992–1994)

References

External links

Living people
Canadian film directors
Canadian cinematographers
German cinematographers
Canadian television directors
German television directors
Year of birth missing (living people)